Wendy Anne Chamberlain (born 20 December 1976) is a British politician serving as Deputy Leader of the Scottish Liberal Democrats since 2021. She was elected Member of Parliament (MP) for North East Fife at the 2019 General Election.

As of 2022, Chamberlain is the Chief Whip of the Liberal Democrats and the Liberal Democrat Spokesperson for Work and Pensions. She previously served as the Liberal Democrat Spokesperson for Northern Ireland and International Development from January 2020 to September 2020, and as the Spokesperson for Scotland and Wales to July 2022. She sits on the Scottish Affairs Select Committee and is the Co-chair of the APPG for Ending the Need for Foodbanks.

Early life and career
Born in Greenock, Inverclyde, Chamberlain was the older of two daughters. She studied English at the University of Edinburgh, and was a member of the Edinburgh University Footlights, a student-run musical-theatre group, and performed in a show with the group at the Edinburgh Festival Fringe. The daughter of a police officer, after finishing university she joined the police force. During her twelve years as a police officer, Chamberlain worked for the Association of Chief Police Officers in Scotland and the Scottish Police College.

After leaving the police, Chamberlain worked as a Communications Lecturer at Fife College, before becoming a Training Manager for the Scottish Resettlement Centre, a Ministry of Defence contractor in Rosyth, and then a Capability Manager for British multinational alcoholic beverages company, Diageo. While working in the private sector, Chamberlain was a Member of the Chartered Management Institute and an Associate Member of the Chartered Institute of Personnel and Development. In 2017, Chamberlain became a member of the board of the Camanachd Association, the world governing body of the Scottish sport of shinty, becoming the first female director of the Association.

Political career
Chamberlain joined the Liberal Democrats after the 2015 United Kingdom general election, which saw the party lose 49 of its 57 MPs. After standing in an "unwinnable" council seat (the ward of Rosyth in Fife Council) in the 2017 Scottish local elections, Chamberlain was asked by Scottish Liberal Democrat leader Willie Rennie to consider putting herself forward to stand in the 2017 general election. Chamberlain stood as a paper candidate in Stirling, finishing fourth in the constituency, winning 3.4% of the vote with a small increase in vote share and absolute votes as compared to the result in 2015.

Chamberlain was selected as the prospective Parliamentary candidate for the Liberal Democrat target seat of North East Fife in June 2018, and in March 2019 was appointed as the Scottish Liberal Democrats' spokesperson for Constitutional Relations by Willie Rennie.
Chamberlain stood for the party in the 2019 general election, comfortably overturning the Scottish National Party's slim two-vote majority in North East Fife by winning 1,316 more votes than the incumbent, Stephen Gethins.

With the Liberal Democrat contingent in the UK Parliament reduced following the general election, Chamberlain was appointed as a party spokesperson in three areas: Political and Constitutional Reform; Scotland, Wales and Northern Ireland; and International Development. In a wide-ranging maiden speech, Chamberlain spoke about her constituency, gender equality, the European Union, and electoral reform, while also paying tribute to her predecessors.

During the course of the COVID-19 pandemic, Chamberlain expressed her belief that "civil liberties mustn't be curtailed more than necessary, and the powers mustn’t be used disproportionately against minority communities", and called for vigilance "to ensure that those [emergency] powers are used properly and evenhandedly". Chamberlain wrote a letter calling for the resignation of Catherine Calderwood, the then Chief Medical Officer for Scotland, following reports that Calderwood had failed to follow coronavirus guidelines by visiting her second home, which was located in Chamberlain's constituency. In April 2020, following the decision to limit the number of MPs sitting in the House of Commons, Chamberlain led a group of opposition MPs (from Plaid Cymru, the Social Democratic and Labour Party, the Alliance Party of Northern Ireland and the Green Party of England and Wales) in calling for the establishment of a COVID-19 select committee. Chamberlain stated that the creation of such a committee was "the only way to guarantee smaller parties from across the political spectrum the opportunity to scrutinise and ask questions of Ministers at this critical time". She sponsored the introduction of the Carer's Leave Bill in the House of Commons in 2022.

Chamberlain was one of three Liberal Democrat MPs (alongside Jamie Stone and Wera Hobhouse) to endorse Layla Moran in her ultimately unsuccessful campaign to become leader of the party.

Personal life
Though originally from Greenock, Chamberlain has lived in Fife since 2003. She is married, and has two children with her husband, Keith, who is a member of the Scottish National Party. Chamberlain has stated that her father encouraged her to get involved in politics.

References

External links 

 Appearances on C-SPAN

|-

1976 births
Living people
Female members of the Parliament of the United Kingdom for Scottish constituencies
Members of the Parliament of the United Kingdom for Fife constituencies
Scottish Liberal Democrat MPs
UK MPs 2019–present
21st-century Scottish women politicians
21st-century Scottish politicians
Scottish police officers
British women police officers
Alumni of the University of Edinburgh
People from Greenock

Officers in Scottish police forces